Gaudet or Guadet is a French surname. Notable people with the surname include:
 Melissa Gaudet (born 1993) American Actress, Artist, and Model
 Christopher Gaudet, Canadian actor 
 Daniel Gaudet (born 1959), Canadian gymnast 
 Francine Gaudet (born 1948), Canadian politician
 Joseph Gaudet (1818–1882), Canadian politician 
 Julien Guadet (1834–1908), French architect and professor
 Kevin Gaudet (born 1963), Canadian ice hockey coach 
 Marguerite-Élie Guadet (1758–1794), French politician 
 Mia M. Gaudet, American cancer epidemiologist 
 Pete Gaudet (born 1942), American basketball coach
 Roger Gaudet (born 1945), Canadian politician
 Suzanne Gaudet (born 1981), Canadian curler
 Wayne Gaudet (born 1955), Canadian politician

See also
 Château Guadet, a winery in Saint-Émilion, Bordeaux, France
 Gaudet Mater Ecclesia, the opening declaration of the Second Vatican Council

French-language surnames